Ernest Wilfred Schunke (26 October 1882 – 6 November 1922) was an Australian rules footballer who played with Richmond in the Victorian Football League (VFL). He has the unusual distinction of having been a VFL umpire, before his VFL playing career.

Family
The son of August Henry Schunke (1850–1928), a butcher, and Elizabeth Schunke, née Coleman, Ernest grew up with three siblings, Charles Henry Schunke (1879–1924) who played for Carlton, Edwin James (1887–1974), and Rose Elizabeth Langstreth (1885–1940), née Schunke.

He married Helena Francesca "Nellie" Spackman in 1913. They had two children: Joy and Ivy.

Football

Umpire
Schunke was a boundary umpire for 11 games in the 1904 VFL season. It was the year that the VFL introduced boundary umpires.

Richmond
Recruited by Richmond from Carlton Districts, he played in the final six rounds of the 1909 VFL season.

Death
He was killed almost instantaneously in a work accident at the James Moore and Son's timber yards in South Melbourne on 6 November 1922, when a cutting knife from a shaping machine, which had come loose, flew through the air and struck him just above the heart.

Footnotes

References
 Hogan P: The Tigers Of Old, Richmond FC, (Melbourne), 1996.

External links

1882 births
Australian rules footballers from Melbourne
Richmond Football Club players
Australian Football League umpires
Industrial accident deaths
Accidental deaths in Victoria (Australia)
1922 deaths
People from Carlton, Victoria